The 2019 Nielsen Pro Tennis Championship was a professional tennis tournament played on hard courts. It was the 28th edition of the tournament which was part of the 2019 ATP Challenger Tour. It took place in Winnetka, Illinois, between 8 and 14 July 2019.

Singles main-draw entrants

Seeds

 1 Rankings are as of July 1, 2019.

Other entrants
The following players received wildcards into the singles main draw:
  Stefan Dostanic
  Bjorn Fratangelo
  Denis Istomin
  Sam Riffice
  Alex Rybakov

The following player received entry into the singles main draw using a protected ranking:
  Maximilian Neuchrist

The following players received entry into the singles main draw using their ITF World Tennis Ranking:
  Jordi Arconada
  Sekou Bangoura
  Aziz Dougaz
  Michail Pervolarakis
  Martin Redlicki

The following players received entry from the qualifying draw:
  Felix Corwin
  John McNally

Champions

Singles

  Bradley Klahn def.  Jason Kubler 6–2, 7–5.

Doubles

  JC Aragone /  Bradley Klahn def.  Christopher Eubanks /  Thai-Son Kwiatkowski 7–5, 6–4.

References

2019 ATP Challenger Tour
2019
2019 in American tennis
July 2019 sports events in the United States
2019 in sports in Illinois